Nash County Public Schools covers a  area covering all of Nash and part of Edgecombe counties in the U.S. state of North Carolina.

History
Rocky Mount City Schools merged with the Nash County Schools in 1992 to create Nash-Rocky Mount Public Schools.

Southern Nash High School took the place of Spring Hope High, Coopers High 1–12, Bailey High, and Middlesex High.

In 2020, the district was renamed to Nash County Public Schools.

Schools

Elementary schools

Bailey Elementary School
Baskerville Elementary School
Benvenue Elementary School
Braswell Elementary School
Cedar Grove Elementary School
Coopers Elementary School
Englewood Elementary School
Hubbard Elementary School
Johnson Elementary School
Middlesex Elementary School
Nashville Elementary School
Pope Elementary School
Red Oak Elementary School
Spring Hope Elementary School
Swift Creek Elementary School
Williford Elementary School
Winstead Avenue Elementary School

Middle schools
Edwards Middle School
Nash Central Middle School
Parker Middle School
Red Oak Middle School
Rocky Mount Middle School
Southern Nash Middle School

High schools
Nash Central High School
Nash Rocky Mount Early College
Northern Nash High School
Rocky Mount High School
Southern Nash High School

Other programs
Fairview Early Childhood Center
NRMPS Early College
WL Greene Alternative School

References

External links
Nash County Public Schools

Education in Nash County, North Carolina
School districts in North Carolina
Education in Edgecombe County, North Carolina